The Islamic Labor Party is a reformist party in Iran and splinter group to the trade union Worker House.

A supporter of Mohammad Khatami’s reform program, it is reportedly based on a platform of socially oriented programs and "protecting the rights of the workers and laborers".

The party has beed described as either "Islamic left" or centrist within Iranian political spectrum. It is also classified as associated with the "republican right" faction, which deals with a platform on modernization and economic growth rather than social justice, along with the Moderation and Development Party and the Executives of Construction Party. The latter is considered a historic ally of the party.

Members
From 1985 to 2001, the party members Abolghasem Sarhadizadeh and Hossein Kamali held office as the Minister of Labour and Social Affairs. Current Minister of Cooperatives, Labour, and Social Welfare, Ali Rabiei holds office since 2013 is also a member of the party. The party members have also been representatives  of Parliament of Iran.

Party leaders

Current officeholders 

Cabinet
 Ali Rabiei (Minister of Labour)
Parliament
 Alireza Mahjoub (Tehran, Rey, Shemiranat and Eslamshahr)
 Mohammad Reza Badamchi (Tehran, Rey, Shemiranat and Eslamshahr)
 Fatemeh Zolghadr (Tehran, Rey, Shemiranat and Eslamshahr)
 Soheila Jolodarzadeh (Tehran, Rey, Shemiranat and Eslamshahr)
City Council
 Mohsen Sorkhou (Tehran)

References

1999 establishments in Iran
Political parties established in 1999
Reformist political groups in Iran
Labour parties
Left-wing parties